K.D. College of Commerce and General Studies is an undergraduate, co-educational college situated in Midnapore, West Bengal. It was established in 1961 and offers bachelor's degree in commerce (B.Com.) and Arts (B.A.). The college is affiliated to Vidyasagar University. In September 2004 it has been awarded B+ grade by the National Assessment and Accreditation Council. However, the accreditation period has since then passed and the accreditation expired.

See also

References

External links 
 
 Vidyasagar University
 University Grants Commission
 National Assessment and Accreditation Council
 

Commerce colleges in India
Universities and colleges in Paschim Medinipur district
Colleges affiliated to Vidyasagar University
Educational institutions established in 1961
1961 establishments in West Bengal